The 1999–2000 FA Women's Premier League Cup was the 9th staging of the FA Women's Premier League Cup, a knockout competition for England's top 36 women's football clubs.

The tournament was won by Arsenal L.F.C., who beat Croydon 4–1 in the final.

References

1999–2000 in English women's football
FA Women's National League Cup